St Peter's RC High School is a Roman Catholic High School on Kirkmanshulme Lane in Belle Vue, Manchester, England.

History
The school opened in 1999, and at the time of its last Ofsted inspection, held 1000 pupils. The new, purpose built, school building opened in 2003 and was extended in 2010 with the addition of eight new classrooms and the refurbishment of the main school to provide improved facilities for pupils with special needs.

Notable former pupils
 Shayne Ward, singer
 Theo Graham, actor

References

External links
 St Peter's RC High School 
 OFSTED report
Arson attack on 8 January 2001

Secondary schools in Manchester
Educational institutions established in 1999
Catholic secondary schools in the Diocese of Salford
1999 establishments in England
School buildings in the United Kingdom destroyed by arson
Voluntary aided schools in England